Lieu is French for a length, location, or a place. In English it refers to:

in lieu of comes from the French expression au lieu de and means “in place of” or “instead of”
obituaries sometimes contain a request that attendees do not send flowers, see in lieu of flowers 

Lieu may also refer to:
 Le Lieu, a municipality in the canton of Vaud, Switzerland

Lieu is also a surname:
 Chi-Lan Lieu, American television presenter
 Judith Lieu (born 1951), British theologian
 Liz Lieu (born 1974), Vietnamese professional poker player
 Mandy Lieu (born 1985), Malaysian American actress
 Ted Lieu (born 1969), American politician